WJCA (102.1 MHz) is a Christian radio station licensed to Albion, New York, and owned by Family Worship Center Church, Inc. The station began broadcasting on December 27, 2001, and aired a Christian format as an owned and operated affiliate of CSN International. In 2005, the station was sold to Family Worship Center Church for $950,000.

References

External links

JCA
Radio stations established in 2001
2001 establishments in New York (state)